Petra Hřebíčková (born 20 September 1979) is a Czech stage and film actress. Her film debut was in the 2006 comedy I Served the King of England. Following her Thalia award, she has appeared in television series and films including  Kawasaki's Rose (2009) and Men in Hope (2011). Since 2010 she has been a regular member of the theatre at Prague's Švandovo divadlo.

Career 
Hřebíčková studied at the Janáček Academy of Music and Performing Arts (JAMU) in Brno, graduating in 2002.

She made her film debut in 2006, appearing in I Served the King of England, directed by Jiří Menzel. At the 2008 Thalia Awards she won the category of Best Actress in a Play, for her performance of the title role in a production of Maryša at the Zlín City Theatre. Months after winning the Thalia award, Hřebíčková left Zlín City Theatre.

In 2009, she appeared in the film Kawasaki's Rose, in which director Jan Hrebejk blended comedy, drama, complicated family dynamics, and Czechoslovakia's secret police. In 2011, she appeared as Alica, in Jiří Vejdělek's Men in Hope, a comedic response to Women in Temptation.

Hřebíčková joined Švandovo divadlo in Prague in 2010. She was nominated for a Thalia award again in 2014, for her role of Gertrude in the performance of Hamlet at Švandovo divadlo, but the award was won by Vilma Cibulková.

Personal life 
In July 2015 Hřebíčková gave birth to a son, Šimon, whose father is actor Matěj Dadák.
Hřebíčková took maternity leave in 2015 for the birth of her first child, but returned to work after just two months.

Filmography

Films

Television

Video games

References

External links 

1979 births
Living people
People from Hodonín
Czech film actresses
Czech television actresses
Czech stage actresses
21st-century Czech actresses
Janáček Academy of Music and Performing Arts alumni
Recipients of the Thalia Award